Sphingopyxis chilensis is a chlorophenol-degrading bacterium from the genus of Sphingopyxis which has been isolated from sediments from the Biobio river in Chile.

References

Sphingomonadales
Bacteria described in 2003